Martín Alund and Horacio Zeballos were the defending champions but Zeballos chose not to compete.
Alund partnered with Facundo Bagnis and lost in the final to compatriots Guillermo Durán and Máximo González 6–3, 6–0.

Seeds

Draw

Draw

External links
 Main Draw

Copa San Juan Gobierno - Doubles
2013 Doubles
Copa